Mario Sports Superstars is a sports video game developed by Bandai Namco Studios and Camelot Software Planning and published by Nintendo for the Nintendo 3DS. The game contains five sports minigames: football, baseball, tennis, golf, and horse racing, and was released in March 2017.

Gameplay
The game consists of five sports – football, baseball, tennis, golf, and horse racing. Despite the number of sports contained, they are not mini-games, but rather, full-scale recreations of each sport. For example, the soccer part of the game contains eleven versus eleven gameplay, the same as is standard in the sport. Each individual sport contains single player tournaments, local multiplayer, and online multiplayer game modes.

Development
The game was first announced during a Nintendo Direct on September 1, 2016. The title was co-developed by Bandai Namco Studios and Camelot Software Planning, with the latter having developed games in the Mario Golf and Mario Tennis series. tri-Crescendo assisted on design. While Nintendo's Mario Sports line has featured stand-alone entries in soccer (Mario Strikers), baseball (Mario Super Sluggers), tennis (Mario Tennis) and golf (Mario Golf), they had never featured horse racing, or compiled all these sports into one compilation. Additionally, all of the sports except tennis had previously been featured in minigames in the Mario Party series. The game was released in PAL regions on March 10, 2017, in North America on March 24, 2017, and in Japan on March 30, 2017. As with Camelot's previous Mario sports games, the soundtrack was written by Motoi Sakuraba.

Reception
Mario Sports Superstars received mixed reviews according to review aggregator Metacritic. Destructoid called it a "lazy experience, one developed solely for the purpose of selling what are basically Mario-branded Topps cards." Nintendo Life stated though that as a single player experience, it was "totally functional yet painfully lifeless". By May 2017, the game had sold over 92,829 copies in Japan.

Notes

References

External links

2017 video games
Association football video games
Camelot Software Planning games
Bandai Namco games
Baseball video games
Golf video games
Horse-related video games
Mario sports games
Multiplayer and single-player video games
Multiple-sport video games
Nintendo 3DS eShop games
Nintendo 3DS games
Nintendo 3DS-only games
Nintendo Network games
Racing video games
Tennis video games
Video games scored by Motoi Sakuraba
Video games developed in Japan
Video games that use Amiibo figurines